Joan LeQuia (later Barker; born March 13, 1935) is a former infielder and pitcher in All-American Girls Professional Baseball League who played for the Grand Rapids Chicks in its 1953 season. Listed at 5' 2, 120 lb., she batted and threw right handed.

Career
LeQuia began playing fast-pitch softball at the age of 14 years. She appeared for the Chicks in a few games during the first half of the season, when financial difficulties at home forced her to leave the league and never returned. She continued playing fast-pitch softball in the Marquette, Michigan area, leading her teams to two state championships over the years, while hitting a .390 batting average in her softball career.

LeQuia worked at AT&T Corporation for 36 years. 
After retiring in 1989, LeQuia attended league reunions and baseball card shows to sign autographs. LeQuia is part of the AAGPBL permanent display at the Baseball Hall of Fame and Museum in Cooperstown, New York opened in 1988, which is dedicated to the entire league rather than any individual figure.

Personal life
On March 13, 1935, LeQuia was born in Negaunee, Michigan. She was married in 1975.

See also
 Woody English, coach

References

External links
 1953 Grand Rapids Chicks

1935 births
Living people
All-American Girls Professional Baseball League players
Grand Rapids Chicks players
Baseball players from Michigan
People from Negaunee, Michigan
Softball players
21st-century American women